Vex may refer to:

Technology
 VEX prefix, a microprocessor opcode prefix and coding scheme for the x64 and x86 instruction set architecture
 Vex, a scripting language in the software Houdini 
 Venus Express, a European Space Agency space mission to the planet Venus
 Vex, a suborbital test Tronador rocket in development by Argentina
 VEX Robotics, a robotics program for elementary through university students

Fiction
Voltayre's Encyclopedia Xenobiologica, a fictional guide to the 1994 Babylon 5 universe
Vex, a character in the 2010 Canadian television series Lost Girl
Vex, a character in the 2011 video game Darkspore
Vex, a character in the 2011 video game The Elder Scrolls V: Skyrim
The Vex, a race of semi-organic machines and one of the four alien enemy factions found in the 2014 video game Destiny
Vex'ahlia "Vex" de Rolo (née Vessar), a Half-Elf Ranger / Rogue character in the 2015 American web series Critical Role where professional voice actors play the role-playing game Dungeons & Dragons
Vex, a mob from Minecraft summoned by Evokers.
Vex, The Gloomist, a playable champion character in the MOBA video game League of Legends

Other uses
 Vex (album), by Steel Pulse
 Vex, Switzerland, a municipality
 Ulorin Vex, English model
 Vex (brachiopod), a brachiopod genus; See List of brachiopod genera
 Virgin Express, a European airline, now merged into Brussels Airlines

See also
 VEX Robotics Competition, a robotics competition
 FIRST Vex Challenge, another robotics competition
 Z.Vex Effects, a US effects pedal company founded by Zachary Vex
 Z.Vex Fuzz Factory, a brand of fuzz box used for musical effects